Peinnebin is the name of several villages in Burma:

 Peinnebin, Banmauk, Sagaing
 Peinnebin, Taunggyi, Shan